Zoltan Kovács (born 21 February 1930) is an Austrian and Hungarian chess player. He was Chess Olympiad individual medalist (1954).

Biography
In 1960, in San Francisco, Kovács won International Chess Open Tournament California Open and California state chess championship.

Zoltan Kovács played for Austria in the Chess Olympiad:
 In 1954, at first reserve board in the 11th Chess Olympiad in Amsterdam (+7, =4, -2) and won individual bronze medal.

Zoltan Kovács played for Hungary in the World Student Team Chess Championship:
 In 1965, at first reserve board in the 12th World Student Team Chess Championship in Sinaia (+2, =2, -3).

From 2000 he rarely participated in chess tournaments.

References

External links
 
 
 
 

1930 births
Living people
Austrian chess players
Hungarian chess players
Chess Olympiad competitors
20th-century chess players